Standards is the fourth studio album by American post-rock band Tortoise. It was released on Thrill Jockey in 2001.

Production
The album was produced using less of the studio manipulation that had been employed on previous records.

Critical reception
The A.V. Club wrote that "the band is poised between capturing a momentary, malleable inspiration and shaping that moment into some timeless anthem, and as always, it chooses to dither and delay, settling for a sometimes pleasant, sometimes maddening, almost always stimulating exploration of atmospherics." Entertainment Weekly called the album "mood music for post-post-moderns, both forward- and backward-looking." Spin deemed it "a cohesion of styles and impulses so tight we might call it originality." The New Zealand Herald called Standards "a neatly intriguing, mish-mash of instrumental rock shot through with lopsided grooves, dreamy drones, not-quite-jazz percussion and vibes, and knob-twiddling electronica rubbing up against a junk-store of old instruments - all of which somehow emerges as an accessible, tuneful, structured affair."

Track listing

Personnel 
Sourced from Bandcamp.

Tortoise
 Jeff Parker - guitar, bass
 Dan Bitney - bass, guitar, percussion, vibes, marimba, keyboards, baritone saxophone
 Douglas McCombs - bass, bass 6, guitar, lap steel
 John Herndon - drums, vibes, keyboards, sequencing
 John McEntire - drums, modular synthesizer, ring modulator guitar, electric harpsichord, keyboards

Charts

References

External links
 

2001 albums
Tortoise (band) albums
Thrill Jockey albums
Warp (record label) albums
Instrumental albums